Tammy Cochran is the debut studio album by the American country music artist of the same name. It was released in 2001 by Epic Records and peaked at #27 on the Billboard Top Country Albums chart. The album includes the singles "If You Can", "So What", "Angels in Waiting" and "I Cry."

Track listing

Personnel
 Richard Bennett - acoustic guitar
 Joe Chemay - background vocals
 Tammy Cochran - lead vocals
 Dan Dugmore - electric guitar, steel guitar
 Glen Duncan - fiddle, mandolin
 Carl Gorodetzky - violin
 David Grissom - electric guitar
 Jim Grosjean - viola
 John Barlow Jarvis - keyboards
 Lee Larrison - violin
 Paul Leim - drums, percussion
 Anthony Martin - background vocals
 Steve Nathan - keyboards
 Lisa Silver - background vocals
 Harry Stinson - background vocals
 Cindy Richardson-Walker - background vocals
 Biff Watson - acoustic guitar
 Bergen White - string arrangements, conductor

Charts

Weekly charts

Year-end charts

References

[ Tammy Cochran] at Allmusic

2001 debut albums
Tammy Cochran albums
Epic Records albums
Albums produced by Blake Chancey